Mixonville, also known as Annex, is an unincorporated community in Conecuh County, Alabama, United States.

A post office operated under the name Mixon from 1888 to 1892 and under the name Annex from 1898 to 1907.

References

Unincorporated communities in Conecuh County, Alabama
Unincorporated communities in Alabama